

Events

Publications
 Lodovico Agostini – First book of canzoni alla napolitana for five voices (Venice: sons of Antonio Gardano)
 Giammateo Asola 
First book of masses for four voices (Venice: sons of Antonio Gardano)
 for eight voices (Venice: heirs of Girolamo Scotto), also contains two Magnificats
 Joachim a Burck –   for four voices (Erfurt: Georg Baumann)
 Joachim a Burck & Johannes Eccard –  (Odes of Ludwig Helmbold, in Latin and German) for four voices (Mühlhausen: Georg Hantzsch), a shared volume of hymn settings
 Ippolito Chamaterò – Introits for four, five, and six voices (Venice: heirs of Girolamo Scotto)
 Girolamo Dalla Casa – First book of madrigals for five and six voices (Venice: the sons of Antonio Gardano)
 Johannes Eccard –  (Twenty New Christian Songs by Ludwig Helmbold) for four voices (Mühlhausen: Georg Hantzsch)
 Andrea Gabrieli – First book of madrigals for six voices (Venice: Antonio Gardano, figliuoli)
 Vincenzo Galilei – First book of madrigals for four and five voices (Venice: Antonio Gardano, figliuoli)
 Jacobus de Kerle –  for six voices (Nuremberg: Theodor Gerlach)
 Orlande de Lassus
, Part 2 (Munich: Adam Berg), a collection of masses for five voices
, Part 3 (Munich: Adam Berg), a collection of liturgical music for five voices
 Giorgio Mainerio – Magnificat in all eight tones for four voices (Venice: Giovanni Bariletto)
 Philippe de Monte
Third book of motets for five voices (Venice: heirs of Girolamo Scotto)
Fifth book of madrigals for five voices (Venice: the sons of Antonio Gardano)
 Melchior Neusidler – Teuetsch Lautenbuch

Births
January 9 (baptized) – Christoph Buel, German composer
January 17 – Robert Fludd, English composer and writer (died 1637)
March 7 (baptized) – John Wilbye, English madrigal composer (died 1638)
May 14 – Francesco Rasi, Italian tenor (died 1621)
July 8 (baptized) – Giovanni Battista Stefanini, Italian composer
September 2 (baptized) – Georg Leopold Fuhrmann, German lutenist, engraver, printer, editor and publisher
September 27 (baptized) – Jean Dufon, Flemish composer and singer
date unknown
Andreas Hakenberger, composer (died 1627)
Francis Tregian the Younger, English recusant and musician, possible compiler of the Fitzwilliam Virginal Book
Claudio Pari, Italian composer

Deaths
 February – Domenico Ferrabosco, Italian composer and singer
 March – Giovanni Contino, Italian composer
March 5 – Pedro Fernández, Spanish composer
 November – Robert White, English composer
date unknown
Jean Guyon, French composer of chansons
Antonfrancesco Doni – Italian writer, academic and musician

 
Music
16th century in music
Music by year